Wassila Alouache (born 11 July 2000) is an Algerian footballer who plays as a centre back for CF Akbou and the Algeria women's national team.

Club career
Alouache has played for Akbou in Algeria.

International career
Alouache capped for Algeria at senior level during the 2021 Arab Women's Cup.

References

External links

2000 births
Living people
People from Bouïra
Algerian women's footballers
Women's association football central defenders
Algeria women's international footballers
21st-century Algerian people